Typhoon Matmo, known in the Philippines as Typhoon Henry, was the first tropical cyclone to impact Taiwan in 2014. It was the tenth named storm and the fourth typhoon of the 2014 Pacific typhoon season. The typhoon is believed to be one of the main reasons behind the crash of TransAsia Airways Flight 222, which occurred a day after it made landfall. There were fifty-four passengers on board (four of whom were reported to be children) and a crew of four, of whom 48 were killed. Taiwan News reported that "first suspicions hinted" the accident might be related to Matmo. The typhoon developed from a cluster of thundershowers consolidating around an area of low pressure in the doldrums. It initially followed a westward track, then made a sharp northwest turn before making landfall on Taiwan, and then China. After moving further inland, Matmo slowly curved back northeastwards and became extratropical before its remnants affected the Korean Peninsula. The typhoon caused damage of US$418 million and there were 65 deaths related to the storm. Matmo brought tropical storm force winds and heavy rainfall to the Philippines, typhoon force winds and torrential rainfall to China and Taiwan and heavy rains to Korea. Two deaths in the Philippines were attributed to the typhoon. The storm left 31,505 people in Taiwan without power.  gusts were reported in the Gimpo International Airport of Seoul.

Meteorological history

Over the next few days, the system's low-level circulation center (LLCC) slowly consolidated with convective banding developing around its southern periphery and a burst of convection over its center. Located in a favorable region, the system slowly intensified, prompting the Joint Typhoon Warning Center (JTWC) to issue a Tropical Cyclone Formation Alert (TCFA) on the system, on July 16. Around the same time, the  Regional Specialized Meteorological Center in Tokyo, operated by the Japan Meteorological Agency (JMA) started tracking the system as a tropical depression. Tracking slowly northwestward, the depression continued to consolidate while the JTWC initiated advisories on it with the identifier 10W. During the evening of July 17, the JMA upgraded the system to a tropical storm, and assigned it the name Matmo. The subsequent six hours saw the JTWC recognizing Matmo as a tropical storm and the Philippine Atmospheric, Geophysical and Astronomical Services Administration (PAGASA) naming it Henry as it entered the Philippine area of responsibility. Around that time, the JMA upgraded Matmo to a severe tropical storm.

By July 19, the center of Matmo had become obscured as deep central convection developed over it. Microwave satellite imagery showed improving convective banding despite the overall structure of the storm being slightly elongated. Subsequent intensification resulted in the JMA upgrading Matmo to a typhoon. The convective banding around the LLCC started to curl inwards as an eye-like feature started developing. Increasing wind shear stemming from the subtropical ridge steering the typhoon inhibited further organization. By July 21, the shear abated somewhat and allowed for some intensification. Tracking well to the southwest of Okinawa, the typhoon increased in both size and organization, with a secondary convective rainband developing along the northern half of the system by July 22. Upper-level outflow also improved and fueled the expansion of convection. A broad eye feature developed with strong convective rainbands wrapped tightly into it. The storm continued on its northwesterly track and made landfall in Taiwan, south of Hualien.

Emerging over the Taiwan Strait early on July 23, Matmo was greatly weakened by its passage over Taiwan. Convective rainbands diminished significantly and its circulation became severely disrupted by Taiwan's rugged terrain. The JMA downgraded Matmo into a severe tropical storm and eventually a tropical storm during this process. The JTWC, however, maintained Matmo as a typhoon during this time. The storm made its second landfall on China, south of Putian, while parts of its rainbands were still over Taiwan and the Philippines. Once onshore, the JTWC downgraded Matmo to a tropical storm and issued their final advisory. The JMA, however, continued tracking Matmo as a tropical storm until it became extratropical on July 25.

Preparations and impact

The remnants of Matmo brought generally light to moderate rains across South Korea, with Seoul reporting . Similar rains were expected over Hokkaido, Japan, with forecasts showing  over the island.

Taiwan

About 5,400 tourists evacuated from two islands of Taiwan. Taiwan's military had gathered and distributed sandbags in anticipation of flooding.

The storm made landfall over Taiwan at peak intensity early on July 23. One person was reported dead and some damages were reported, and another 5 were injured, due to the storm. A tourist was also reported missing after taking pictures on a shore. Agricultural losses throughout Taiwan amounted to at least NT$594.9 million (US$20 million). Hualien County sustained the greatest damage, accounting for half the losses.

China
In China, an Orange Tropical Cyclone Alert in areas near Fuzhou. Throughout the country, 16 people were killed and economic losses amounted to ¥2.47 billion (US$398 million).

Throughout Fujian Province, 182 EMU trains suffered outages.

See also

Typhoon Sepat (2007)
Typhoon Morakot
Typhoon Saola (2012)
Typhoon Kalmaegi (2008)
TransAsia Airways Flight 222

References

External links

JMA General Information of Typhoon Matmo (1410) from Digital Typhoon
JMA Best Track Data of Typhoon Matmo (1410) 
JMA Best Track Data (Graphics) of Typhoon Matmo (1410)
JMA Best Track Data (Text)

10W.MATMO from the U.S. Naval Research Laboratory

2014 in Taiwan
2014 Pacific typhoon season
Typhoons in China
Typhoons
Tropical cyclones in 2014